James Paul Rodham (born 2 March 1983) is a former English cricketer. Rodham was a right-handed batsman who bowled right-arm off break. He was born in Ashford, Surrey.

Rodham represented the Middlesex Cricket Board in two List A matches against the Derbyshire Cricket Board and Cambridgeshire in the 1st and 2nd rounds of the 2003 Cheltenham & Gloucester Trophy which were held in 2002. In his 2 List A matches, he scored 27 runs at a batting average of 13.50, with a high score of 23. In the field he took a single catch. With the ball he took 4 wickets at a bowling average of 13.50, with best figures of 4/23.

References

External links
James Rodham at Cricinfo
James Rodham at CricketArchive

1983 births
Living people
People from Ashford, Surrey
People from Surrey
English cricketers
Middlesex Cricket Board cricketers